Prinjolata is a traditional dessert from Malta. The dessert gets its name from the Maltese word prinjol meaning pine nuts which are used in both the filling and the topping.

Cultural Significance
Prinjolata is generally prepared as a treat to be eaten at the Maltese Carnival; a festival introduced to Malta in the 1400s, and popularised by the Knights of St John a century later. In Malta, Carnival is held five days before Ash Wednesday.

References

Maltese cuisine
Desserts